In enzymology, an orotate reductase (NADH) is an enzyme that catalyzes the chemical reaction

(S)-dihydroorotate + NAD+  orotate + NADH + H+

Thus, the two substrates of this enzyme are (S)-dihydroorotate and NAD+, whereas its 3 products are orotate, NADH, and H+.

This enzyme belongs to the family of oxidoreductases, specifically those acting on the CH-CH group of donor with NAD+ or NADP+ as acceptor.  The systematic name of this enzyme class is (S)-dihydroorotate:NAD+ oxidoreductase. This enzyme is also called orotate reductase (NADH).  This enzyme participates in pyrimidine metabolism.  It has 2 cofactors: FAD,  and FMN.

References

 
 
 

EC 1.3.1
NADH-dependent enzymes
Flavoproteins
Enzymes of unknown structure